= Feral boar =

Feral boar may refer to:

- A male feral pig of the domesticated subspecies Sus scrofa domesticus. (Females are feral sows.)
- A misnomer ("feral") for a wild boar (a.k.a. "wild pig", Sus scrofa) of either gender (although females are more properly wild sows)
